Elbridge Gerry (1744–1814) was the 5th vice president of the United States

Elbridge Gerry may also refer to:

Elbridge Gerry (Maine politician) (1813–1886), U.S. Representative from Maine
Elbridge Thomas Gerry (1837–1927), American lawyer and reformer
Elbridge T. Gerry Sr. (Elbridge Thomas Gerry, 1908–1999), banker and polo player
Elbridge T. Gerry (pilot boat)

See also
Elbridge Gerry Lapham (1814–1890), U.S. Senator from New York
Elbridge Gerry Spaulding (1809–1897), U.S. Representative from New York
Elbridge Gerry House
Elbridge T. Gerry Mansion